Medusavirus is a nucleocytoplasmic large DNA virus first isolated from a Japanese hot spring in 2019. It notably encodes all five types of histones — H1, H2A, H2B, H3, and H4 — which are involved in DNA packaging in eukaryotes, raising the possibility that they may have been involved in the origin of eukaryotes. The virus can harden amoebas of the species Acanthamoeba castellanii into stone-like cysts, but infection usually causes infected amoebas to burst open. The virus was named after Medusa, the monster in Greek mythology whose gaze turned people to stone.

NCLD-viruses 

Medusavirus is a part of a phylum called Nucleocytoviricota, which is referred as nucleocytoplasmic large DNA virus (NCLDV). These viruses has large double-stranded DNA genome and the length of the genome could be over than 100kb. NCLDV infects various eukaryotic hosts such as amoebas.

Morphology 

Viral particle is composed of icosahedral capsid which is 260nm in diameter. This 8nm single layered capsid is covered with 14nm spherical-headed spikes. Viral double-stranded DNA is backed inside the 6nm thick internal membrane.

Maturation 

Medusaviruses has unique viral particle maturation process comparing several other viruses. Virus does not form viral factory in the host cytoplasm to replicate the viral genome. The proposed maturation process starts by generating the pseudo- Empty viral particles with the help of scaffold proteins. Then these pseudo-Empty particles release the scaffold proteins and Empty particles are formed. After the release of proteins the Empty particle uptakes the viral DNA near the host nucleus and via semi-Full stages the Full particles are eventually formed.

References 

DNA viruses
Unaccepted virus taxa